The Andrew's High (H.S.) School  was established in India in 1952 by a handful of educationists under the banner of "Andrew's Education Society".

History
Andrew's High (H.S.) School is a co-educational institute with English as the medium of instruction. It started as a primary school but, with demands gradually increasing, classes were shifted to 33 Gariahat Road(S), Kolkata. The school received its affiliation as a High School in 1957 and was upgraded as a Higher Secondary School in 1961 with all three streams i.e., Arts, Commerce and Science.

The school observed its golden jubilee celebration in 2002. February 2 is observed as the foundation day of the school. Andrew's High (H.S.) School is a co-educational institute with English as the medium of instruction and it follows the syllabus and curriculum of the West Bengal Board of Secondary Education and the West Bengal Council of Higher Secondary Education.

Academic
The school has primary, secondary and higher secondary branches.

Affiliations
The primary section of the School is run by a private body whereas the secondary and higher secondary sections are Government aided. The secondary branch of the school is affiliated to the West Bengal Board of Secondary Education, while the Higher Secondary Branch is affiliated to the West Bengal Council of Higher Secondary Education.

Location
The school is located at 33 Gariahat Road (S), Kolkata 700031.

Notable alumni
Alumni are named "Andrewzians".
 Sharad Kapoor - actor
 Sabyasachi Chakrabarty - actor
 Anindya Bose -  singer, composer, lyricist
 Pradeep Sarkar - Film Director (Parineeta) 1971 batch.
 Dipesh Chakrabarty - historian

Formation of Alumni Association
After a long and continuous efforts by some alumni the Official Alumni Association of the school known as Andrew's Alumni Association  was formed in the Year 2012.

References

External links

Government schools in India
Primary schools in West Bengal
High schools and secondary schools in Kolkata
Educational institutions established in 1952
1952 establishments in West Bengal